The Sun Inn is a Grade II listed, parlour pub in Leintwardine, Herefordshire, England.

It is on the Campaign for Real Ale's National Inventory of Historic Pub Interiors.

The 200+ year old establishment, one of the UK's last remaining parlour pubs, had been owned and operated by resident Flossie Lane, who was born in the Sun Inn in 1914, and took over ownership more than 70 years ago, until her death in June 2009 aged 94. 

Without anyone to take her place, there had been fears that it would be sold for redevelopment, but with the help of CAMRA, and the Save the Sun Inn campaign, the pub was purchased from Flossie's nieces, who were keen for it to remain a pub, by a neighbour and friend of Flossie's and a local brewery owner. 

The new owners added a rear pavilion-style extension which has become the main bar venue. The original two front rooms remain, a red-brick public bar and the more comfortable parlour.

References

Hotels in Herefordshire
Grade II listed pubs in Herefordshire
National Inventory Pubs